Charles Alan Lawson, known professionally as Alan Lawson, (born May 12, 1961) is an attorney and jurist from Florida. He served as a justice of the Supreme Court of Florida from 2016 to 2022. He previously was a judge on the Florida Fifth District Court of Appeal. He is a founding shareholder with Lawson Huck Gonzalez, PLLC and handles civil and administrative litigation, appeals, and government affairs.

Biography

Early life and education

Lawson was born on May 12, 1961, in Lakeland, Florida. He received an Associate of Arts degree, summa cum laude, in 1981 from Tallahassee Community College. He received a Bachelor of Science degree, summa cum laude, in 1983 from Clemson University. He received a Juris Doctor, Order of the Coif and summa cum laude, in 1987 from Florida State University College of Law.

Career

He served as an associate and partner at the law firm of Steel Hector & Davis, Miami and Tallahassee, Florida, from 1987 to 1995. He served as general counsel at Verses Wear, Inc., in 1996. He served as an Assistant County Attorney, Orange County, Florida, from 1997 to 2001. He served as a Judge of the Ninth Judicial Circuit Court of Florida, from 2002 to 2005. He served as a Judge of the Florida Fifth District Court of Appeal from 2005 to 2016 and served as Chief Judge of that Court from 2015 to 2016.

Florida Supreme Court service

On December 16, 2016, Governor Rick Scott appointed Lawson to serve as a justice of the Supreme Court of Florida, to the seat vacated by Justice James E. C. Perry, who retired on December 30, 2016. He was previously nominated by the Florida Judicial Nominating Commission. His appointment became effective on December 31, 2016, with his investiture ceremony occurring on April 5, 2017.

Lawson was retained for a full six year term on November 6, 2018. However, on April 29, 2022 Lawson announced his imminent retirement, effective August 31, 2022. Lawson officially retired on August 31, 2022.

References 

1961 births
Living people
21st-century American judges
Clemson University alumni
Florida lawyers
Florida state court judges
Florida State University College of Law alumni
Justices of the Florida Supreme Court
Judges of the Florida District Courts of Appeal
People from Lakeland, Florida
Tallahassee Community College alumni